Tekena Nitonye Tamuno (28 January 1932 – 11 April 2015) was a Nigerian historian and Vice-chancellor of the University of Ibadan. He was the President of the Board of Trustees of Bells University of Technology.

Education and career
Tamuno attended St Peter's School in his hometown of Okrika for primary education. Upon completion he attended Okrika Grammar School. From 1953 to 1958 he studied history at the University of Ibadan before leaving the country in 1960 to continue his studies at Birkbeck, University of London and Columbia University. In 1962 he joined the Department of History at the University of Ibadan where he remains as professor emeritus.

In addition to his administrative and teaching career, he is an author and has chaired public service commissions.

Tamuno died on 11 April 2015 in Ibadan, aged 83.

University of Ibadan timeline
Lecturer, 1963
Senior Lecturer, 1967
Professor, 1971
Head, department of History, 1972–1975
Dean, Faculty of Arts, 1973–1975
Vice Chancellor, 1975–1979.

Selected books
Nigeria and Elective Representation, 1923–1947.Heinemann (1966)  
The evolution of the Nigerian state: The Southern phase, 1898–1914. Humanities Press, 1972. 
Abebe: Portrait of a Nigerian leader. ALF Publications, 1991. 
Herbert Macaulay, Nigerian patriot. Heinemann Educational, 1975. 
Nigeria: Its people and its problems. 
Nigerian universities, their students and their society: Factors of leadership, time, and circumstance.  
The police in modern Nigeria, 1861–1965: Origins, development, and role. 
Nigeria Since Independence. Heinemann Educational Books.  
Nigerian federalism in historical perspective. Federalism and Political Restructuring in Nigeria. Ibadan: Spectrum.

See also 
List of vice chancellors in Nigeria

References

1932 births
2015 deaths
Alumni of Birkbeck, University of London
Columbia University alumni
Academic staff of the University of Ibadan
Educators from Rivers State
20th-century Nigerian historians
People from Okrika
Writers from Rivers State
Historians of Nigeria
Vice-Chancellors of the University of Ibadan